Pachiza District is one of five districts of the province Mariscal Cáceres in Peru. Its seat is Pachiza.

References